Sir Bryan O'Loghlen, 3rd Baronet (pronounced and sometimes spelt Brian O'Lochlen) (27 June 1828 – 31 October 1905), Australian colonial politician, was the 13th Premier of Victoria.

Biography

O'Loghlen was born in County Clare, Ireland, a younger son of the distinguished Irish judge Sir Michael O'Loghlen, 1st Baronet, and his wife Bidelia Kelly, and was educated at Trinity College, Dublin and was admitted to the Irish Bar in 1856.

In 1862 he emigrated to Victoria and was appointed a Crown Prosecutor in 1863. He succeeded to his father's baronetcy in 1877 on the death of his brother, Colman, and in the same year he was elected, in absentia, to the British House of Commons for County Clare, replacing his brother, but did not take his seat.

O'Loghlen narrowly lost the election for the seat of North Melbourne in May 1877. In February 1878 O'Loghlen, a recognised leader of the Irish Catholic community in Victoria, was elected to the Victorian Legislative Assembly for West Melbourne in a by-election. In 1880 he transferred to West Bourke, which he held until February 1883.

O'Loghlen was a radical liberal in Victorian politics: he favoured breaking up the estates of the landowning class (who were mainly English and Scottish Protestants) to provide land for small farmers, and ending the power of the landowner-dominated Victorian Legislative Council.

He also wanted government aid for Roman Catholic schools, but not if this meant government supervision of what they taught. He served as Attorney-General in the reforming ministry of Graham Berry from 27 March 1878 to 1880, and was a loyal supporter of Berry in his struggles with the Council and the conservatives it represented. His appointment as Attorney-General constituted an office of profit from the Crown; in Victoria he won the consequent ministerial by-election, whereas in the UK a select committee deemed he had vacated his Westminster seat, triggering a by-election.

When Berry's third government resigned in July 1881, O'Loghlen succeeded him as leader of the liberal forces and became Premier—the second Irish Catholic to hold the position. His government was described as "unspectacular", and "a collection of party rebels, Catholics and opportunists". Much of the radical impetus of the Berry years had passed and O'Loghlen's government achieved little. In 1883, a scandal arose over the activities of Railways Minister Thomas Bent, who was accused of corruption. In the March 1883 election, the liberals were defeated and O'Loghlen lost his seat.

In 1888, O'Loghlen returned to politics as member for Belfast, which he held until 1889, when the seat was renamed Port Fairy, which he represented from 1889–1894, and again from 1897–1900. He was Attorney-General again, albeit only for one year, in the Patterson government (1893–1894).

He died aged 77 in 1905.

References

Sources
Geoff Browne, A Biographical Register of the Victorian Parliament, 1900–84, Government Printer, Melbourne, 1985
Don Garden, Victoria: A History, Thomas Nelson, Melbourne, 1984
Kathleen Thompson and Geoffrey Serle, A Biographical Register of the Victorian Parliament, 1856–1900, Australian National University Press, Canberra, 1972
 Raymond Wright, A People's Counsel. A History of the Parliament of Victoria, 1856–1990, Oxford University Press, Melbourne, 1992

Citations

External links 
 

|-

1828 births
1905 deaths
Australian Roman Catholics
Ologhlen, Bryan, 3rd Baronet
Members of the Parliament of the United Kingdom for County Clare constituencies (1801–1922)
UK MPs 1874–1880
Members of the Victorian Legislative Assembly
Treasurers of Victoria 
Politicians from County Clare
Premiers of Victoria
Irish barristers
Alumni of Trinity College Dublin
19th-century Irish people
Irish emigrants to colonial Australia
Attorneys-General of the Colony of Victoria
19th-century Australian lawyers